Mapinguari desvauxianus is a species of orchid native to tropical South America. It is known from French Guiana, Suriname, Guyana, Venezuela, Colombia, Ecuador, Peru, and Brazil.

Mapinguari desvauxianus was long known by the name Maxillaria desvauxiana Rchb.f. Recent molecular studies have found Maxillaria  as it has long been viewed to be an unnatural hodgepodge composed of groups not closely related to each other. Hence it has been proposed that the genus should be split into several genera, proposals that have been gaining acceptance.

References

External links 

Maxillariinae
Orchids of South America